The Denmark men's national basketball team represents Denmark in international basketball competition. The national team is controlled by the Danish Basketball Association.

The Denmark national team competed regularly at the EuroBasket in the 1950s, the top European tournament. Their best appearance came in 1951. Although since then, the team has struggled to maintain consistency to challenge the international elites. Denmark also has yet to reach qualification to play on the global stage at the FIBA World Cup.

History

EuroBasket 1951
Denmark debuted in the European championships at the EuroBasket 1951 in Paris. They were defeated in all of their preliminary round games, going 0–4. They ended up in last place in their group. In a direct elimination match against Luxembourg, Denmark took a 46–45 lead with 5 seconds left. A final half-court shot by Luxembourg bounced off the rim, giving Denmark its first ever win at the EuroBasket tournament and advancing the team to the first classification round.  They picked up another win there, against Scotland, finishing in third place in the group at 1–2.  Their third win of the tournament came against Portugal in the 13th–16th place classification semifinal. Denmark then lost to Switzerland in the 13th/14th place match to finish 14th of the 18 teams with a record of 3–7.

EuroBasket 1953
Two years later, at the EuroBasket 1953 in Moscow, Denmark did not fare as well.  They dropped eight of their matches (three in the preliminary round, three in the first classification round, and the two-second-round classification games) on their way to a 16th-place finish out of the 17 teams in the tournament.

EuroBasket 1955
At the EuroBasket 1955 in Budapest, the national team struggled there as well just as they did at the prior EuroBasket. Losing all eight of their matches in non competitive fashion, this time they finished in last place of the 18 teams at the event.

Later years
After the EuroBasket 1955, the Danish national team regressed and never qualified for a major tournament again. Though, they did achieve some success on a lower level, at the European Championship for Small Countries, where they won Gold in 2010.

Competitive record

FIBA World Cup

Olympic Games

Championship for Small Countries

EuroBasket

Results and fixtures

2021

2022

2023

Team

Current roster
Roster for the EuroBasket 2025 Pre-Qualifiers matches on 23 and 26 February 2023 against Norway and Slovakia.

Depth chart

Head coach position
 Allan Foss – (2004–2009)
/ Peter Hoffman – (2010–2011)
 Pieti Poikola – (2013–2016)
 Erez Bittman – (2017–2021)
 Arnel Dedić – (2021–2022)
 Allan Foss – (2022–present)

Past rosters
1951 EuroBasket: finished 14th among 18 teams

3 Knud Lundberg, 4 Knud Norskov, 5 Erik Korsbjerg, 6 Erik Wilbek, 7 Peter Tantholdt, 8 Belger Can, 9 Bent Sondergaard, 10 Erik Melbye, 11 Sven  Thomsen, 12 John Christensen, 13 Ove Nielsen, 14 Kai Sogaard, 15 Erik Carlsen, 16 Niels Mygind (Coach: ?)

1953 EuroBasket: finished 16th among 17 teams

3 Kai Sorensen, 4 Knud Norskov, 5 Knud Lundberg, 6 Peter Tantholdt, 7 John Christensen, 8 Erik Madsen, 10 Torben Starup-Hansen, 11 Ivan Rasmussen, 12 Ove Nielsen, 13 Erik Wilbek, 14 Pierre Meilsej, 15 Willi Mouritsen, 16 John Nielsen (Coach: ?)

1955 EuroBasket: finished 18th among 18 teams

3 Kai Sogaard, 4 Erik Korsbjerg, 5 Peter Tantholdt, 6 Pierre Meilsej, 7 An Lillelund, 8 Ivan Rasmussen, 9 Ove Nielsen, 10 T Storup, 11 P Hintz, 12 T Malmquist, 13 Willi Mouritsen, 14 S Sparre (Coach: ?)

Kit

Manufacturer
2018–present: Spalding

See also

Sport in Denmark
Denmark women's national basketball team
Denmark men's national under-20 basketball team
Denmark men's national under-18 basketball team
Denmark men's national under-16 basketball team
Denmark men's national 3x3 team

Notes

References

External links
Official website 
Denmark FIBA profile
Denmark National Team – Men at Eurobasket.com
Denmark Basketball Records at FIBA Archive

Videos
 Denmark v Belarus – Full Game – FIBA EuroBasket 2022 Pre-Qualifiers Youtube.com video

Men's national basketball teams
Basketball in Denmark
Basketball teams in Denmark
Basketball
1951 establishments in Denmark